Zolki Band is a Belarusian indie rock band from Brest, which was founded in 2013 by former members of the Daj Darohu, Intra muros, and D_tails bands.

History 
The band's first single “Śniežań” topped the charts for the 2013–14 season of the music portal Tuzin.fm. The song was recorded in collaboration with the Landau band and is dedicated to the civil protests in Minsk taken place in December 2010 and the following crackdown. 

In 2014 Zolki Band released its debut album Doŭhi doŭhi dzień supported with music videos for songs “Rak” and “B.E.Z.R.A.Z.L.I.C.H.I.E. — heta tradycyja.” Later that year the band was nominated in the category of “Opening of the Year” at the “Heroes of the Year Awards” (presented by Tuzin.fm).

In May 2019 Zolki Band released a music video for the song “Drevy i cieni” dedicated to protests against the construction of the Chinese-funded lead-acid battery factory near Brest. Also the release of the second album was announced, the first part of which entitled “Šort Šort Night, Pt. 1” was subsequently released on September 15, 2019.

Band members 
 shell — drums
 green — bass guitar
 kukuruzo — acoustic guitar, keyboards, backing vocals
 trikil — guitar, keyboards, backing vocals
 f.s.t. — lead vocals 

Production
 dizel — sound engineer
Former members
 rotten — guitar

Discography 
Studio albums
 2014 - Doǔhi doǔhi dzień
 2019 - Šort Šort Night, Pt. 1
 2021 - Šort Šort Night, Pt. 2

EPs, singles, lives
 2013 - Śniežań (single, together with Landau)
 2015 - Choladna z vami (EP)
 2016 - KvaziČalaviek (single)
 2017 - Kaliadny raǔt (live)
 2018 - Zolki Band у Belsat Music Live (live)
 2019 - Drevy i cieni (single)
 2020 - Sonca ŭ kufli (single)
 2020 - Času strała (single)
 2020 - Spaghettification (single)
 2022 - Matematyčny eciud u svietłych tanach (sigle)

References

External links 
 Zolki Band at Spotify
 Official page on Bandcamp

Belarusian indie rock groups
Belarusian rock music groups